Roberto de Leonardis (February 4, 1913 – September 21, 1984) was Italian film script translator, film dialogue writer and film lyricist, best known for his long-lasting cooperation with the Walt Disney Company, being basically a monopolist in writing scripts for dubbing Disney's films into Italian, from the late 1940s to his death.

He was known as a meticulous translator, faithfully adapting the English-language peculiarities to the Italian audience.

Biography
He was born in Naples to a family of an Italian Navy admiral. He followed his father's career and graduated as an officer from the Military Academy in Livorno, Tuscany. During World War II he was commanding officer of an Italian naval ship. In 1943, after Italy surrendered to the Allies, his ship was captured by the Japanese, and he was detained as a POW until the Americans freed him in 1945.

In the beginning of his film career he was a lyricist under the pseudonym "Pertitas".

In 1949 he founded a documentary short film production company Filmeco. In 1958 he closed Filmeco and founded the Royfilm company, which almost exclusively did dubbing of films into Italian. It dubbed not only for Disney, but also for other studios, such as Metro-Goldwyn-Mayer, Paramount, and Universal.

Commemoration
In 1997 he was posthumously inducted into the  Disney Legends Hall of Fame.

The 1983 Federico Fellini film E la nave va (whose Italian-language dialogs were edited by di Leonardis) has a cameo: the name of the captain of the ship (Italian: comandante della nave) is Roberto de Leonardis, a hint to the nickname of the original Leonardis, "Comandante", and his former naval occupation.

A comprehensive biography of de Leonardis was published in 2017 by Nunziante Valoroso in the book Un comandante alla corte di Walt Disney. La carriera di Roberto de Leonardis leggenda del doppiaggio.

Notes

References

1913 births
1984 deaths
Film people from Naples
Writers from Naples
Italian documentary filmmakers
Italian cinematographers
Italian male screenwriters
Italian male songwriters
20th-century Italian screenwriters
20th-century Italian translators
Italian lyricists
Disney people